Computational philosophy or digital philosophy is the use of computational techniques in philosophy. It includes concepts such as computational models, algorithms, simulations, games, etc. that help in the research and teaching of philosophical concepts, as well as specialized online encyclopedias and graphical visualizations of relationships among philosophers and concepts. The use of computers in philosophy has gained momentum as computer power and the availability of data have increased greatly. This, along with the development of many new techniques that use those computers and data, has opened many new ways of doing philosophy that were not available before. It has also led to new insights in philosophy.

See also 
 Internet Encyclopedia of Philosophy
 PhilPapers
 Stanford Encyclopedia of Philosophy

References

External links 
 Centre for Digital Philosophy at the University of Western Ontario
 PhiloComp.net at the University of Oxford

Applied philosophy
Computational fields of study